KB Rahoveci, or simply Rahoveci, is a professional basketball club based in the city Rahoveci, Kosovo. The club currently plays in the Kosovo Basketball Superleague. Its fan club is called Vreshtarët

History
In the 2016–17 season, the small club from the town of Rahovec got promoted to the Superleague and they managed to finish in sixth position in the table. They think they are rivals of KB YLLI, a  club from the nearby city of Theranda.In the 2018–19 Superleague, Rahoveci finished as runners-up behind Prishtina.

On 24 July 2019, it was announced that Rahoveci would make its debut in European competitions. The team qualified for the qualifying rounds of the 2019–20 FIBA Europe Cup. Rahoveci lost both games to U-BT Cluj-Napoca from Romania.

Honours
Kosovo Basketball Superleague
Runners-up (1): 2018/19 

Kosovo Cup
Runners-up (1): 2018/19

Kosovo Basketball First League
Winners (1): 2016/17

Liga Unike
Third Place (1): 2020/21

Arena 
The club plays in the sport center Mizahir Isma, with a capacity for around 4,000 spectators.

European record

Players

Current roster 

.

Depth chart

References

External links
Official website
EuroBasket.com

Basketball teams in Kosovo
 
Orahovac